Helene  is a moon of Saturn. It was discovered by Pierre Laques and Jean Lecacheux in 1980 from ground-based observations at Pic du Midi Observatory, and was designated . In 1988 it was officially named after Helen of Troy, who was the granddaughter of Cronus (Saturn) in Greek mythology. Helene is also designated  (12), which it was given in 1982, and Dione B, because it is co-orbital with Dione and located in its leading Lagrangian point. It is one of four known trojan moons.

Exploration 

Helene was initially observed from Earth in 1980, and Voyager flybys of Saturn in the early 1980s allowed much closer views. The Cassini–Huygens mission, which went into orbit around Saturn in 2004, provided still better views, and allowed more in-depth analysis of Helene, including views of the surface under different lighting conditions. Some of the closest images of Helene to date are from the Cassini spacecraft's 1800 km flyby on March 3, 2010, and another very successful imaging sequence occurred in June 2011. There have been many other approaches over the course of the Cassini mission.

Geology 

Images of Helene taken by the Cassini spacecraft, with resolutions of up to 42 meters per pixel, show a landscape characterized by broad 2-10km scale depressions with interior slopes no greater than 12°. These basins are likely the decayed remains of old impact craters.

Thin, elongated km-scale raised grooves trace the slopes of many of Helene's basins, and likely represent mass flow features, indicating that the moon is undergoing active geologic processes such as mass-wasting and erosion. Digital elevation models suggest that the grooves have a positive relief of between 50 and 100 meters.

Simulation models show that the time series of surface activity on Helene is chaotic.

Surface material 

Helene's surface material is of a relatively high reflectance, suggesting grain sizes between 1 and 100 micrometers. Small craters appear somewhat buried, suggesting recent accretional processes of some sort.

Stress-strain laboratory testing of impact-gardened lunar regolith samples show that at low packing densities they behave like Non-Newtonian “Bingham” materials, i.e., having the plastic quality of candle-wax and glaciers. This observation suggests that Helene's snow-like surface material may behave as a non-Newtonian mass flow and could be primarily responsible for the visible flow patterns seen on its low-gravity surface.

Selected observations 

Mostly raw greyscale images with near infrared or ultraviolet channels.

References 

Sources
 
 
 
 
 
  (supporting online material, table S1)

External links 

 Helene Profile by NASA's Solar System Exploration; see instead Cassini Solstice Mission: Helene
 The Planetary Society: Helene
 Helene has two faces —The Planetary Society : Helene Mini Atlas—Mar. 11, 2010
 Cassini catches Helene —The Planetary Society : Video & Views—Jun. 20, 2011

Moons of Saturn
Trojan moons
19800301
Moons with a prograde orbit